Deir Salman  is a Syrian village located in Markaz Rif Dimashq, Rif Dimashq to the southeast of the al-Nashabiyah nahiyah ("subdistrict"). According to the Syria Central Bureau of Statistics (CBS), Deir Salman had a population of 6,227 in the 2004 census.

References 

Populated places in Markaz Rif Dimashq District